Second Working Cabinet may refer to:
 Second Working Cabinet (Sukarno)
 Second Working Cabinet (Joko Widodo)